This is a shortened version of the fifteenth chapter of the ICD-9: Certain Conditions originating in the Perinatal Period. It covers ICD codes 760 to 779. The full chapter can be found on pages 439 to 453 of Volume 1, which contains all (sub)categories of the ICD-9. Volume 2 is an alphabetical index of Volume 1. Both volumes can be downloaded for free from the website of the World Health Organization.

Maternal causes of perinatal morbidity and mortality (760–763)
  Fetus or newborn affected by material conditions which may be unrelated to present pregnancy
  Noxious influences affecting fetus or newborn via placenta or breast milk
  Fetal alcohol syndrome
  Exposure to narcotics, perinatal
  Exposure to cocaine, perinatal
  Fetus or newborn affected by maternal complications of pregnancy
  Newborn affected by PROM
  Fetus or newborn affected by complications of placenta, cord, and membranes
  Other compression of umbilical cord affecting fetus or newborn
  Fetus or newborn affected by other complications of labor and delivery

Other conditions originating in the perinatal period (764–779)

Length of gestation and fetal growth
  Slow fetal growth and fetal malnutrition
  Newborn, light-for-dates, weight unspec.
  Disorders relating to short gestation and unspecified low birthweight
  Preterm infant, weight unspec.
  Disorders relating to long gestation and high birthweight
  Exceptionally large baby, 4,500g plus
  Post-term infant
  Prolonged gestation of infant

Birth trauma
  Birth trauma
  Subdural and cerebral hemorrhage due to birth trauma
  Injuries to scalp
  Epicranial subaponeurotic hemorrhage
  Birth trauma, fracture of clavicle
  Birth trauma, unspec.

Hypoxia/asphyxia/respiratory
  Intrauterine hypoxia and birth asphyxia
  Fetal distress, during labor, in infant
  Birth asphyxia, severe
  Birth asphyxia, unspec.
  Respiratory distress syndrome
  Other respiratory conditions of fetus and newborn
  Meconium aspiration syndrome

Infections
  Infections specific to the perinatal period
  Congenital rubella
  Congenital cytomegalovirus infection
  Other congenital infections specific to the perinatal period
  Tetanus neonatorum
  Omphalitis of the newborn
  Neonatal infective mastitis
  Neonatal conjunctivitis and dacryocystitis
  Neonatal candida infection
  Other infections specific to the perinatal period
  Sepsis, neonatal

Hemorrhage/hemolysis/endocrine/jaundice/hematologic
  Fetal and neonatal hemorrhage
  Fetal blood loss
  Intraventricular hemorrhage of fetus or newborn
  Intraventricular hemorrhage unspecified grade
  Intraventricular hemorrhage grade I
  Intraventricular hemorrhage grade II
  Intraventricular hemorrhage grade III
  Intraventricular hemorrhage grade IV
  Subarachnoid hemorrhage of newborn
  Umbilical hemorrhage after birth
  Gastrointestinal hemorrhage of fetus or newborn
  Adrenal hemorrhage of fetus or newborn
  Cutaneous hemorrhage of fetus or newborn
  Other specified hemorrhage of fetus or newborn
  Unspecified hemorrhage of newborn
  Hemolytic disease of fetus or newborn, due to isoimmunization
  Hemolytic disease, RH isoimmunization
  Hemolytic disease, ABO isoimmunization
  Other perinatal jaundice
  Jaundice, newborn, prematurity
  Jaundice, newborn, unspec.
  Lucey-Driscoll syndrome
  Jaundice, newborn, breast milk
  Endocrine and metabolic disturbances specific to the fetus and newborn
  Infant of diabetic mother syndrome
  Hypocalcemia
  Hypoglycemia, neonatal
  Hematological disorders of fetus and newborn
  Hemorrhagic disease of newborn
  Transient neonatal thrombocytopenia
  Disseminated intravascular coagulation in newborn
  Other transient neonatal disorders of coagulation
  Polycythemia neonatorum
  Congenital anemia
  Anemia of prematurity
  Transient neonatal neutropenia
  Other specified transient hematological disorders of fetus or newborn
  Unspecified hematological disorder specific to newborn

Digestive
  Perinatal disorders of digestive system
  Swallowed maternal blood
  Necrotizing enterocolitis

Integument/temperature regulation
  Conditions involving the integument and temperature regulation of fetus and newborn
  Hydrops fetalis not due to isoimmunization
  Sclerema neonatorum
  Cold injury syndrome of newborn
  Other hypothermia of newborn
  Other disturbances of temperature regulation of newborn
  Other and unspecified edema of newborn
  Congenital hydrocele
  Breast engorgement in newborn
  Other specified conditions involving the integument of fetus and newborn
  Unspecified condition involving the integument and temperature regulation of fetus and newborn

Other
  Other and ill-defined conditions originating in the perinatal period
  Convulsions in newborn
  Other and unspecified cerebral irritability in newborn
  Cerebral depression coma and other abnormal cerebral signs in fetus or newborn
  Feeding problems in newborn
  Feeding problems in newborn
  Bilious vomiting in newborn
  Other vomiting in newborn
  Failure to thrive in newborn
  Drug reactions and intoxications specific to newborn
  Drug withdrawal syndrome in newborn
  Termination of pregnancy (fetus)
  Preventricular leukomalacia
  Other specified conditions originating in the perinatal period
  Neonatal bradycardia
  Neonatal tachycardia
  Delayed separation of umbilical cord
  Meconium staining
  Cardiac arrest of newborn
  Other specified conditions originating in the perinatal period
  Unspecified condition originating in the perinatal period

International Classification of Diseases